The following is a list and analysis of exports from the United States for 2020 and 2019 in millions of United States dollars. The United States exported $2,131.9 billion worth of goods and services in 2020, down $396.4 billion from 2019. This consisted of $1,434.8 billion worth of goods and $697.1 billion worth of services. The goods and services deficit was $678.7 billion in 2020, up $101.9 billion from $576.9 billion in 2019. The 2020 increase in the goods and services deficit reflected an increase in the goods deficit of $51.5 billion, or 6.0%, to $915.8 billion and a decrease in the services surplus of $50.4 billion, or 17.5%, to $237.1 billion. As a percentage of U.S. gross domestic product, the goods and services deficit was 3.2% in 2020, up from 2.7% in 2019. The large decline in exports in 2020 has been attributed to the effects of COVID-19 pandemic. Some key highlights of the 2020 data are:

 Exports of goods decreased $217.7 billion to $1,434.8 billion in 2020.
 Capital goods decreased $87.5 billion.
 Civilian aircraft decreased $27.4 billion. 
 Civilian aircraft engines decreased $18.4 billion. 
 Industrial supplies and materials decreased $59.2 billion. 
 Other petroleum products decreased $15.5 billion. 
 Crude oil decreased $14.8 billion. 
 Fuel oil decreased $13.3 billion. 
 Automotive vehicles, parts, and engines decreased $35.3 billion. 
 Automotive parts and accessories decreased $13.3 billion.
 Passenger cars decreased $10.5 billion.
 Consumer goods decreased $30.8 billion. 
 Gem diamonds decreased $8.5 billion. 
 Artwork, antiques and other collectibles decreased $4.5 billion. 
 Jewelry decreased $4.4 billion. 

 Exports of services decreased $178.7 billion to $697.1 billion in 2021.
 Travel decreased $117.2 billion.
 Transport decreased $34.7 billion.

Exports of goods

Export of services

See also
List of imports of the United States
Economy of the United States
Foreign trade of the United States
List of U.S. states and territories by exports
List of the largest trading partners of the United States

References

atlas.media.mit.edu - Observatory of Economic complexity - Products exported by The United States (2016)

Foreign trade of the United States
Exports
United States